Zhuan Zhu (專諸; died 515 BC) was an assassin in the Spring and Autumn period.Zhuan Zhu used to be a butcher，he was very filial to his mother. As Prince Guang (later King Helü of Wu) wanted to kill King Liao of Wu and take the throne himself, Zhuan Zhu was recommended to Prince Guang by Wu Zixu. In 515 BC he managed to kill King Liao in a party with a dagger hidden in a fish. He was killed after he had completed his mission.
In folklore, the dagger he used to kill King Liao was named Yuchang (魚腸), or "Fish intestines", because it was small enough to be hidden in a fish.

515 BC deaths
Zhou dynasty people
Chinese regicides
Year of birth unknown
Wu (state)
6th-century BC Chinese people
Chinese assassins